Lenin Peak or Ibn Sina (Avicenna) Peak (Lenin Choqusu, لەنىن چوقۇسۇ; , Pik Lenina; , qulla‘i Lenin/qullaji Lenin, renamed қуллаи Абӯалӣ ибни Сино (qulla‘i Abûalî ibni Sino) in July 2006), rises to 7,134 metres (23,406 ft) in Gorno-Badakhshan (GBAO) on the border of Tajikistan and Kyrgyzstan, and is the second-highest point of both countries. It is considered one of the less technical 7000 m peaks in the world to climb and it has by far the most ascents of any 7000 m or higher peak on Earth, with every year seeing hundreds of mountaineers make their way to the summit.  Lenin Peak is the highest mountain in the Trans-Alay Range of Central Asia, and in the Pamir Mountains in Tajikistan it is exceeded only by Ismoil Somoni Peak (7,495 m). It was thought to be the highest point in the Pamirs in Tajikistan until 1933, when Ismoil Somoni Peak (known as Stalin Peak at the time) was climbed and found to be more than 300 metres higher. Two mountains in the Pamirs in China, Kongur Tagh (7,649 m) and Muztagh Ata (7,546 m), are higher than the Tajik summits.

Names
Lenin Peak was originally named Mount Kaufmann after Konstantin Kaufman, the first Governor-General of the Russian Turkestan. In 1928, the mountain was renamed Lenin Peak after the Russian revolutionary and first leader of the Soviet Union, Vladimir Lenin. In Tajikistan, the peak was renamed again in July 2006, and today it is officially called in Tajik Qullai Abuali ibni Sino (қуллаи Абӯалӣ ибни Сино, Ibn Sina Peak or, alternatively, Avicenna Peak) after Abu Ali ibn Sina (Avicenna). 

In Kyrgyzstan, the peak is still officially called Lenin Chokusu (Ленин Чокусу, Lenin Peak). However, in October 2017, Kyrgyz president Almazbek Atambayev called for renaming the peak "Manas Peak", after the hero of the Epic of Manas.

Local Kyrgyz names include Jel-Aidar ("Wind's God") and Achyk-Tash ("Open Rock"). Achik-Tash, is also the name of a plateau and a base camp at an elevation of 3,600 m on a popular northern climbing route to Lenin Peak, which starts in the southern Kyrgyz city of Osh, a day's drive north of the border. Another suggested local name, Pik  Kaman  ("wild  pig",  "boar") probably belongs to an officially unnamed peak west of Lenin Peak.

Climbing history and routes 

Initial exploration of this part of Central Asia occurred in the period 1774–82. Arguably the first recorded travel through the region is the involuntary journey of the slave Filipp Efremov (an ethnic Russian), who escaped from slavery in Bukhara. He crossed the Fergana valley, then via Osh, the Chigirik Pass and Terekdavan Pass he reached the Kashgar and finally came over the Karakorum. He was the first European who crossed the Alai Mountains.

Scientific expeditions to the Alai Mountains began in 1871, when Alexei Pavlovich Fedchenko discovered the Trans-Alai (Zaalayskiy) Range and its main peak. The first geographical expedition which came nearest to the base of the future Lenin Peak in the early 20th century was arguably the expedition of Nikolai Leopol'dovich Korzhenevskiy.

In September 1928, three mountaineers -the Germans  and Karl Wien, and the Austrian - from the Soviet-German scientific expedition, made the first attempt to reach the highest point of the Trans-Alai Range, which at that time had the name Kaufman Peak. 

They started climbing upstream of the Saukdara river along the South slope of Trans-Alai Range also Trans-Alay Range. From the river head they continued climbing along the Greater Saukdara Glacier towards a saddle at an elevation of 5820 m (this saddle is also known as the Krilenko Pass). On September 25, 1928, they started climbing from the saddle along the NE Ridge and at 15.30 they reached the summit. At the time, Kaufman Peak was the highest summit reached by men.

The title Lenin Peak was first applied to the highest point of the Trans-Alai Range in the same year (1928). When it was renamed after Lenin it was believed to be the highest point in the USSR.

Their attempt lasted for four days with three camps (5700 m, 6500 m and 7000 m). The expedition started climbing from the Achik-Tash canyon in the Alai valley. The summit attempt itself was started along the Western ice slope of the Lenin glacier. They continued climbing along the North Face, passing the rocks that were later given the name Lipkin's Rocks. At the end of the second day they reached the crest of the NE ridge at an elevation of about 6500 m. During the following day and a half they climbed along the NE Ridge and, utterly exhausted, reached the summit.

The third ascent was three years later, in 1937, when eight Soviet climbers under the direction of Lev Barkhash reached the summit by the same route. This was at the beginning of mass political repressions in the Soviet Union and many of the most prominent Soviet climbers, including Lev Barkhash, were brought to trial.

Subsequent attempts to climb Lenin Peak could not begin until 1950, when the USSR began to recover from the Second World War. On August 14, 1950, twelve climbers (V. Aksenov, K, Zaporojchenko, Y. Izrael, V. Kovalev, A. Kormshikov, Y. Maslov, E. Nagel, V. Narishkin, V. Nikonov, V. Nozdryuhin, I. Rojkov) under the direction of Vladimir Racek reached the summit for the fourth time.

All three Soviet expeditions including Racec's expedition of 1950 were by almost the same route via the NE Ridge.

The route which now is known as the classic route, via the Razdelnaya Peak and NW  Ridge, was first climbed in 1954 by the team of Soviet climbers under the direction of V. Kovalev (P. Karpov, E. Nagel, V. Narishkin, V. Nozdryuhin).

In 1960, a group of eight Soviet climbers made a successful direct climb along the North Face (15.08.1960).

There are 16 established routes, nine on the southern side and seven on the northern slopes. The peak is quite popular with climbers due to its easy access and some uncomplicated routes. However, the peak is not without its share of disasters. 

In August 1974, an entire team of eight Russian women climbers died high on the mountain in a storm. Elwira Szatajewa maintained radio contact with base camp as her team-mates perished around her. In her final words she said, 'I'm alone now, with just a few minutes left to live. See you in eternity.'

The first high-speed ascent of Lenin Peak was completed in 1987. The team, led by Valery Khrichtchatyi, included G. Lunyakov, Z. Khalitov, Anatoli Boukreev, V. Suviga, Y. Moiseev and A. Tselischev.  The climb beginning from ABC base camp (4400 m) to the summit and return to ABC base camp took 12 hours.

Under the leadership of Leonid Troshchinenko the team, composed of 19 mountaineers from Leningrad and three from Kazakhstan, made the first winter ascent of Lenin Peak in 1988. With temperatures hovering at -45° C, only six men reached the summit: including Valery Khrichtchatyi, Balyberdin, S. Arsentiev, U. Moiseev, I. Tulaiev and V. Dedi.

In 1987 The first solo ascent was achieved by the great high altitude mountaineer Anatoli Boukreev. An avalanche triggered by an earthquake killed 43 climbers in 1990.

As it is now, considering the existing infrastructure and BC/ABC locations, there are three most attractive routes from the North (approximately indicated on the Scheme): Lipkin's rocks route and NE Ridge; the classic North Face route; the route via Razdelnaya Peak and the NW Ridge.

References

External links
 Lenin Peak on summitpost
 Description district Lenin Peak, climbing routes on Lenin Peak
 Alternative 3D map of climbing routes
 

Mountains of Kyrgyzstan
Mountains of Tajikistan
Kyrgyzstan–Tajikistan border
International mountains of Asia
Seven-thousanders of the Pamir
Avicenna